Chasen Parker (born April 22, 1994) is an American actor and filmmaker who was born in Burbank, California. He began working as an actor at the age of 2 on an Arby's national TV commercial. He worked as a series regular, starting at the age of 4, on Sunset Beach as Benjy Evans as well as appeared in General Hospital and 7th Heaven. Approaching his teen years, his family moved to Houston, Texas, and he attended theatre school at Sam Houston State University, then transferred to film school at Emerson College in Boston. Parker made many short films in which he acted in, produced, wrote and directed. He moved back to Los Angeles in 2018. He is the grandson of actress Eleanor Parker.

Film 
In late 2020, Parker co-founded his production company Cardinal Trio Pictures with John C. Hall and Nick Scherma

Theater 
Parker made his professional theater debut in Stages Repertory Theatre's production of We Are Proud to Present a Presentation About the Herero of Namibia, Formerly Known as South West Africa, from the German Sudwestafrika Between the Years 1884-1915 to critical acclaim. The Houston Chronicle called it "the best play of the year"  and added "Parker somehow makes [his character] the most emotionally breakable of the troop even while playing a monster."

Television
Parker first appeared in a TV series when he was age 4, joining Sunset Beach, the first daytime drama from executive producer Aaron Spelling. Parker was on the show for 97 episodes.

 Episode #1.755 (1999) ... Benjy Evans
 Episode #1.754 (1999) ... Benjy Evans
 Episode #1.753 (1999) ... Benjy Evans
 Episode #1.751 (1999) ... Benjy Evans
 Episode #1.748 (1999) ... Benjy Evans
 7th Heaven (TV Series), episode In Praise of Women (1999) ... Young Matt
 General Hospital (TV series) Young Nikolas Cassadine (1998)

Other work
 TV commercial for Arby's
 TV commercial for Kellogg's
 TV commercial for Microsoft

References

American male child actors
Living people
1994 births
20th-century American male actors
21st-century American male actors
American male television actors